Maurício Zacarias Reinaldo Rodrigues Gomes (born 2 November 1954), known simply as Reinaldo, is a former Portuguese footballer who played as a striker.

Club career
Born in Bissau, Portuguese Guinea, Reinaldo spent his entire professional career in Portugal. After starting out in the lower leagues with SC Vila Real he played four years in the second division, with F.C. Famalicão and Sport Clube da Régua.

Reinaldo signed for top level giants S.L. Benfica in 1978, as the Lisbon side was coached by English John Mortimore, and wasted no time making an impact alongside legendary Nené, scoring 32 league goals in his first two season combined and eventually helping Benfica to the conquest of three major titles, including the double in the 1980–81 campaign; his official debut came in a home game against F.C. Barreirense, on 29 August.

After leaving Benfica, with official totals of 116 games and 59 goals, Reinaldo represented Boavista FC, S.C. Braga, G.D. Estoril Praia (division two) and Varzim SC. He retired from football at nearly 33 years of age.

International career
Guinea-born Reinaldo was capped for Portugal six times, scoring one goal. He made his debut in a friendly with Spain in Vigo on 26 September 1979 (1–1 draw), and his last game was on 8 June 1983 in another exhibition game, with Brazil in Coimbra (0–4 defeat).

|}

Honours
Famalicão
Second Division: 1977–78

Benfica
Portuguese League: 1980–81
Portuguese Cup: 1979–80, 1980–81

References

External links

1954 births
Living people
Sportspeople from Bissau
Bissau-Guinean footballers
Portuguese footballers
Association football forwards
Primeira Liga players
Liga Portugal 2 players
F.C. Famalicão players
S.L. Benfica footballers
Boavista F.C. players
S.C. Braga players
G.D. Estoril Praia players
Varzim S.C. players
Portugal international footballers
Bissau-Guinean expatriate footballers